William A. Wallace (born June 6, 1867) was an American politician. He served in the Illinois State Senate from 1938 until 1943, representing the Cook 3 district, including Chicago. He was a Democrat.

Early life and education

William A. Wallace was born in 1867 in Maryland. He graduated from Lincoln University in Pennsylvania. After graduating, he moved to Chicago, Illinois.

Career and life

In 1938, he was elected to the Illinois State Senate after defeating Republican William E. King.

See also
 List of African-American officeholders (1900–1959)

References

African-American state legislators in Illinois
Democratic Party Illinois state senators
African-American men in politics
20th-century African-American politicians
20th-century American politicians
1867 births
Year of death missing